Boulder Creek Provincial Park is a provincial park in British Columbia, Canada, located to the west of BC Highway 16 near Smithers, in the Bulkley Valley.

External links

Bulkley Valley
Provincial parks of British Columbia
1999 establishments in British Columbia